Muhammad Sidi Brahim Sidi Embarek Basir (born 1942 or 1944 – disappeared June 18, 1970) was a Sahrawi nationalist leader, disappeared and presumedly executed by the Spanish Legion in June 1970.

Biography 
Muhammad Bassiri was born in a Sahrawi family in Tan-Tan, which was retroceded to Morocco after Treaty of Angra de Cintra in 1958, (nowadays Southern Morocco, then part of the Cap Juby in Spanish protectorate in Morocco) The Tarfaya strip, which included Bassiri's hometown, had been attributed to Morocco in a clause imposed by France in the Franco-Spanish Treaty of 1912, despite the fact that Morocco had never had either sovereignty, territorial right or actual control over it, as ruled by the International Court of Justice in 1975. Its cession to Morocco in 1958, which caused a clash between Sahrawi guerrillas and Moroccan troops in Tan-Tan, is interpreted by Sahrawi nationalists as an amputation of their historical territory.

In 1957 he left Tan-Tan for the newly independent Morocco to attend school in Marrakesh, and proceeded to study the Quran & Arabic in Cairo, Egypt and Journalism in Damascus, Syria, where he get in touch with the Panarabism ideology. On returning to Morocco in 1966, he founded Al-Shihab (The Torch), a Sahrawi nationalist newspaper. He also worked as a journalist in Casablanca.

In March 1968 he was allowed to enter to Spanish Sahara (he had tried to enter in December 1967, but he was detained and expelled), because of the closing of the newspaper by Moroccan authorities in late 1967, and settled in the city of Smara as a Quranic teacher. It was there he started to organize the anti-colonial movement known as the movement of liberation (In Arabic: Harakat Tahrir) calling for end of Spanish occupation of the Sahara. Bassiri stressed non-violence (influenced by the peaceful struggle of Gandhi in the colonized India) and wanted to bring about change through democratic action, although the ruthless colonial rule imposed by Francisco Franco's Spain forced the Harakat Tahrir to remain clandestine. Bassiri didn't want a precipitated independence, but to negotiate with the Spanish authorities

Disappearance 
On early June 17, 1970 the organization appeared openly in a peaceful demonstration against the Spanish colonial rule, asking for autonomy (as a first step to independence) and self-determination in the Zemla neighborhood of El-Aaiun, in parallel to an official Francoist demonstration. The Spanish governor-general of the colony, General José María Pérez de Lema y Tejero, went to Zemla to discuss with the organizers of the demonstration, but did not reach an agreement to make them leave the place and join the official demonstration. Tensions escalated between the growing mass of Sahrawi protesters and the Spanish reservist soldiers, who were stoned-throwed after detaining 3 speakers of the protest, answered opening fire on the mass at 17:30 PM. Disturbance continued until 19:00 PM, when troops of the Tercio "Juan de Austria" of the Spanish Legion brutally put down what remained of the protesters. The events were seen by the Spanish authorities as a defiance to the official demonstration organized by the General governor, made to show the world the supposed Sahrawi support to the Spanish regime and refusal to the UN involvement. These events have been dubbed the Zemla Intifada by Sahrawis.

Bassiri, who had abandoned Zemla before violence erupted, was informed of the events. He was offered to escape to Mauritania by car, but he refused it. According to Salem Lebser, he replied: "Nobody could say I'm an adventurer who has led people to death and then disappeared..I already fled once Morocco, where I felt like a stranger. But I would not fled from my own land". Bassiri was tracked down that night, detained around 03:00 AM of June 18, and jailed at El Aaiun Territorial Police headquarters. On June 19, and after being allegedly tortured, he testified before the Spanish military authorities. A photograph of him registering before the "Habs Shargui" prison authorities is the last known trace of him. Later, he was allegedly moved to "Sidi Buya", the Spanish Legion headquarters in El Aaiun. According to testimonies given by three different persons to then apostolic prefect to Spanish Sahara Félix Erviti Barcelona, Bassiri was executed by a Spanish Legion patrol in the dunes surrounding El Aaiun on the night of 29 July 1970, although Spanish authorities of the time claimed that he had been expelled from the territory to Morocco on that date, moreover they also claimed later that Bassiri had entered Spanish Sahara illegally from Algeria in September 1970. Spanish colonial authorities even claimed in 1971 that Bassiri had died on the Skhirat coup d'état against Hassan II.

Present-day Sahrawi nationalists such as the Polisario Front honor him as the father of the modern Sahrawi independence struggle, as well as the first of the Sahrawi "disappeared" and a national martyr for the Liberty.

See also
List of people who disappeared

References

1940s births
1970 deaths
1970s missing person cases
Enforced disappearances in Morocco
Missing person cases in Morocco
Movement for the Liberation of Saguia el Hamra and Wadi el Dhahab politicians
People executed by Francoist Spain
People from Tan-Tan
Sahrawi activists
Sahrawi democracy activists
Sahrawi human rights activists
Sahrawi journalists
Sahrawi prisoners and detainees
Sahrawi rebels